Santa Isabel Island (also known as Isabel, Ysabel and Mahaga) is the longest in Solomon Islands,  the third largest in terms of surface area, and the largest in the group of islands in Isabel Province.

Location and geographic data
Choiseul lies to the north-west, Malaita to the south-east. The Pacific Ocean lies to the north, and Guadalcanal (Isatabu) to the south.

The highest point in Santa Isabel is Mount Sasari, . The Marutho river runs down Mount Sasari to the ocean at Hofi. Almost all the rivers or streams run from that centre point except for those at the other tip of the island on the Katova side.

The administrative centre is Buala. The nearest airport is Fera Airport on neighbouring Fera Island.

History
The first European landing in the Solomon Islands archipelago was made at Santa Isabel Island, by the Spanish explorer Álvaro de Mendaña on 7 February 1568. It was charted as Santa Isabel de la Estrella (St. Elizabeth of the Star of Bethlehem in Spanish). A settlement was established by the Spaniards, and a small boat (known in the accounts as "the brigantine") was built to survey and chart the surrounding sea and islands. These local explorations led by Maestre de Campo Pedro Ortega Valencia and Alférez Hernando Enríquez resulted in the discoveries of the islands of Malaita, Guadalcanal, Savo, Vangunu, Choiseul, Makira, Ulawa, Malaupaina, Malaulalo, Ali'ite, and Ugi Island. The Spanish immediately came into contact with Solomon Islanders and at first the relationship was cordial. However, the Spanish expedition's need for fresh food and water quickly led to tension and conflict, the Solomon Islanders’ subsistence economy being unable to provide continuous supplies to the Spanish.

Having found no gold and little food, and beset by attacks and sickness, the Spanish colonists shifted their colony to the site of today's Honiara on Guadalcanal, and the settlement on Santa Isabel was abandoned.

Santa Isabel islanders suffered attacks from blackbirding in the nineteenth century (the often brutal recruitment or kidnapping of labourers for the sugar plantations in Queensland and Fiji).

In April 1885 a German Protectorate was declared over the North Solomon Islands, including Santa Isabel Island. In 1900, under the terms of Treaty of Berlin, signed on 14 November 1899, Germany transferred the North Solomon Islands (except for Bougainville and its surrounding islands) to the British Solomon Islands Protectorate in exchange for the British giving up all claims to Samoa. Missionaries settled on Santa Isabel Island under both protectorates, converting most of the population to Christianity. In the early 20th century several British and Australian firms began large-scale coconut planting.

During World War II, the Imperial Japanese Navy established a seaplane base at Rekata Bay on the northeast coast. The base was bombed by American forces from August 1942 to August 1943. In the following month, the Japanese evacuated the base. Large bomb craters can still be seen near the former Japanese base.

Since the independence of Solomon Islands in July 1978, Santa Isabel Island has been administered as part of Isabel Province.

On 27 May, 2011, seventeen men were arrested for burning down the houses in Ulubea riverside settlement, 33 houses in all, as a result of a property dispute. The number was later expanded to 31.

Languages
The population of Santa Isabel speak as many as eight languages in addition to English and Solomon Islands Pijin. 
Blablanga language
Bughotu language
Cheke Holo language formerly called Marine or Maringe
Gao language
Kokota language
Laghu language (extinct)
Zabana language
Zazao language

Further reading
Geoffrey M. White, Identity through History; Living Stories in a Solomon Islands Society, Cambridge Studies in Social and Cultural Anthropology Series (No. 83) 
Informal learning strategies in the Solomon Islands

Notes and references

Islands of the Solomon Islands
1568 establishments in the Spanish Empire